Tomer Ginat (born November 7, 1994) is an Israeli professional basketball player for Hapoel Tel Aviv of Israeli Basketball Premier League. Ginat was named the Israeli League Rising Star in 2017.

Early life
Ginat was born and raised in Gesher Haziv, Israel, by his parents Iris and Eyal. He played for Ironi Nahariya youth team.

Professional career

Early years (2013–2016)
In 2013, Ginat started his professional career with Ironi Nahariya.

In 2014, Ginat signed a two year deal with Ironi Kiryat Ata of the Israeli National League. In his second season with Kiryat Ata, he averaged 15.6 points, 9.2 rebounds and 2.5 assists per game. Ginat helped the team reach the League Finals, where they eventually lost to Hapoel Gilboa Galil. He was named the National League Israeli Player of the Year.

Hapoel Tel Aviv (2016–2020)

2016–17 season
On June 10, 2016, Ginat signed a three-year deal with Hapoel Tel Aviv. On March 11, 2017, Ginat recorded a season-high 23 points, shooting 10-for-15 from the field, along with 12 rebounds, in an 83–70 win over Hapoel Jerusalem. Three days later, Ginat was named Israeli League Player of the Week. In his first season with Hapoel, he averaged 9.3 points and 5.7 rebounds per game. On June 9, 2017, Ginat was named the Israeli League Rising Star.

2017–18 season
On May 28, 2017, Ginat signed a three-year contract extension with Hapoel Tel Aviv. On October 8, 2018, Ginat recorded a then career-high 15 rebounds, along with 14 points, in an 81–78 win over Hapoel Holon. He was subsequently named Israeli League Round 1 MVP. In his second season with Hapoel, he averaged 10 points, 5.8 rebounds and 1.6 assists per game. Ginat was named two-time Israeli Player of the Month for games played in October and April, earning a spot in the All-Israeli League Second Team. Ginat helped Hapoel reach the Israeli League Final Four for the first time in thirteen years.

2018–19 season
On May 12, 2019, Ginat recorded a career-high 21 rebounds, along with 13 points and two steals in an 85–76 loss to Maccabi Tel Aviv. In his third season with Hapoel, he averaged 14 points, 7.1 rebounds, 2 assists and 1.6 steals per game. Ginat was named two-time Israeli Player of the Month for games played in November and February. He led Hapoel to the Israeli League Playoffs, where they eventually were eliminated by Maccabi Tel Aviv in the Quarterfinals. On June 6, 2019, Ginat earned a spot in the All-Israeli League First Team.

2019–20 season
On December 2, 2019, Ginat recorded a career-high 25 points, along with five rebounds and four assists in a 102–97 overtime win over Hapoel Be'er Sheva.

Metropolitans 92 (2020–present)
On June 10, 2020, he has signed with Metropolitans 92 of LNB Pro A.

National team career
Ginat is a member of the Israeli national basketball team. On November 24, 2017, he made his first appearance for the senior team at the 2019 FIBA Basketball World Cup qualification match against Estonia.

Ginat was also a member of the Israeli U-20 national team. In August 2017, Ginat participated in the 2017 Summer Universiade, where he averaged 14.2 points, 8.6 rebounds and 2 assists per game as the team claimed 6th place in the tournament.

References

External links
 RealGM profile
 FIBA profile

1994 births
Living people
Hapoel Tel Aviv B.C. players
Ironi Kiryat Ata players
Ironi Nahariya players
Israeli expatriate basketball people in France
Israeli men's basketball players
Metropolitans 92 players
Power forwards (basketball)